The 1956–1957 season was Manchester United's 55th season in the Football League, and their 12th consecutive season in the top division of English football.

United retained their league title this season, which was also notable for being the breakthrough season of forward Bobby Charlton, who made his debut on 6 October 1956 in the league match against Charlton Athletic a few days before his 19th birthday and scored twice, making 17 appearances and scoring 12 goals that season and collecting a league title medal, his appearances mostly coming at the expense of Dennis Viollet.
As Old Trafford didn't have floodlights installed at the time, United's first three European home games were played at Maine Road instead. United reached the semi-finals of the European Cup, where they were beaten by eventual winners Real Madrid. They also reached the FA Cup final, where they lost 2–1 to Aston Villa in a game where they were handicapped by an injury to goalkeeper Ray Wood, meaning Jackie Blanchflower had to stand in for him in goal.

FA Charity Shield

First Division

FA Cup

European Cup

Squad statistics

References

Manchester United F.C. seasons
Manchester United
1957